Martellidendron karaka is a species of plant in the family Pandanaceae, endemic to Madagascar.

References

Endemic flora of Madagascar
karaka